Nuzendla is a village in Palnadu district of the Indian state of Andhra Pradesh. It is located in Nuzendla mandal of Narasaraopet revenue division.

Geography 
Gundlakamma stream is the source of water for the village.

Governance 

Nuzendla gram panchayat is the local self-government of the village. It is divided into wards and each ward is represented by a ward member.

Education 

As per the school information report for the academic year 2018–19, the village has a total of 8 schools and 2 colleges. These include one model, one KGBV, one private and 5 Zilla Parishad/Mandal Parishad schools. and as well as one intermediate and one degree college.

See also 
List of villages in Guntur district

References 

Villages in Guntur district
Mandal headquarters in Guntur district